Donglin Temple is a name used for several temples in China:

Donglin Temple (Jiujiang)
Donglin Temple (Shanghai)

Buddhist temple disambiguation pages